This article contains a summary of the fate of various cities in the American fictional drama/adventure television series Jericho.

The attack

According to episode "A.K.A.", the attacks destroyed twenty-three major American cities. The nuclear material used for creating the bombs in the attacks were brought in by the U.S. government. After the Soviet Union fell, neglected military and the satellite republics started selling nuclear material on the black market. So the Central Intelligence Agency started an operation: "Project Red Bell". The objective of the project was to obtain that material by any and all means necessary, but a few years before the events of the series a shipment disappeared on its way to the Department of Energy storage compound in Oak Ridge.

The material was used to create twenty-five 20-kiloton devices, which were disseminated to extremist cells active within the United States. It was a cross-section of "domestic militia, anarchists and religious fanatics" - terrorist groups that would never ordinarily collaborate, ideologically or politically. The only thing that connected them was the desire to take down the federal government of the United States. The entire plan was orchestrated by someone with deep resources, an ability to coordinate diverse groups and by all indications, an American.

After someone (believed to be Thomas Valente) tipped off the terrorists about the government's knowledge of the plot, they moved up the timetable for the attacks.

As described in the episode "The Day Before", the attacks were to take place simultaneously, using the 20-kiloton nuclear devices hidden in 55-gallon oil drums, at 8:05 p.m. EDT, during the U.S. President's emergency address to Congress on Tuesday, September 19.

Darcy Hawkins states in the episode "Casus Belli" that 30 million people were killed outright in the attacks. A news report in the second season premiere episode, "Reconstruction", says that "over 15 million" were "left dead or dying" and "another 40 million homeless."

Cities reportedly attacked
Cities are identified within the show as having been attacked, mainly through a series of maps maintained by a number of characters tracking the destroyed cities.

In the episode "A.K.A.", it was stated that there were 25 explosive devices. Twenty-four cities are identified as being attacked, however it is also known that Columbus, Ohio ("The Day Before"), New York City ("Long Live the Mayor") and St Louis, Missouri ("The Day Before") were targeted. It is not known if the error lies with the initial number of explosive devices, or incorrect knowledge of the characters on the show.

The attacked cities are listed below, along with the episodes in which the references to the city are made.

 Atlanta, Georgia (1, 2, 3, 6, 13, 14, 18)
 Baltimore, Maryland (13, 18, OVS)
 Boston, Massachusetts (13, 14)
 Charlotte, North Carolina (13, 14, 18)
 Chicago, Illinois (2, 3, 6, 13, 14, 18)
 Dallas, Texas (3, 6, 13, 18)
 Denver, Colorado (1, 2, 3, 4, 6, 13, 18)
 Detroit, Michigan (6, 13, 14, 18)
 Hartford, Connecticut (13, 14, 18)
 Houston, Texas (13, 18)
 Lawrence, Kansas (initially reported as Kansas City) (3, 4, 7, 13, 14, 18)
 Indianapolis, Indiana (17, 19, 20) 

 Los Angeles, California (3, 13, 18)
 Miami, Florida (13, 14?, 18)
 Minneapolis, Minnesota (6, 13, 14, 18)
 Norfolk, Virginia (18)
 Philadelphia, Pennsylvania (2, 6, 13, 14, 18)
 Phoenix, Arizona (13, 18)
 Pittsburgh, Pennsylvania (13, 14, 18)
 St. George or Cedar City, Utah (13, 14)
 San Diego, California (2, 6, 13, 18)
 San Francisco, California (3, 13, 18)
 Seattle, Washington (3, 6?, 13, 18)
 Washington, D.C. (7, 13, 14, 18, OVS)

Sources:
Episode 1 ("Pilot") - The mushroom cloud over Denver is seen in Jericho. Later, Dale Turner listens to a voicemail message from his mother in Atlanta, which is cut off by an explosion.
Episode 2 ("Fallout") - Robert Hawkins' map in his basement is seen for the first time. He is seen marking cities with push pins.
Episode 3 ("Four Horsemen") - Part of a Chinese news broadcast is seen on the television in Bailey's Tavern. A map of the United States is shown with some cities marked with red dots. The cities are marked with Chinese characters in the approximate locations of Atlanta (亚特兰大), Chicago (芝加哥), Dallas (达拉斯), Denver (丹佛), Los Angeles (洛杉矶), New York City (纽约), San Francisco (旧金山) and Seattle (西雅图). All of these apart from New York are corroborated with evidence from future episodes. Airplane pilots recordings also mention clouds over Denver, Kansas City (actually Lawrence), and South, somewhere in Texas, possibly Dallas.
Episode 4 ("The Walls of Jericho") - A map at the bar shows Denver and Kansas City as bombed, while some found footage is uncertainly guessed as Cincinnati
Episode 6 ("9:02") - Robert Hawkins' map in his basement is seen again, found by his daughter. Further cities are marked with push pins.
Episode 7 ("Long Live the Mayor") - Gray Anderson returns from his travels with further news about the attacks, mentioning Lawrence, Washington D.C., and New York.
Episode 13 ("Black Jack") - In a visit to the Black Jack Fairgrounds, a map is seen with attacked cities marked with red dots. Sarah Mason mentions seeing clouds on Washington, D.C. and Baltimore, Maryland.
Episode 14 ("Heart of Winter") - Robert and Sarah Mason visit the 'Old Man' and see a map similar to the one in Robert's basement. 
Episode 18 ("A.K.A.") - Robert's basement map is seen once again, with additional cities marked.
Online Video Segment - In the "Ask the Mystery Woman" online video segments , Sarah mentions both the Baltimore and Washington, D.C. blasts.

Some facts stated on the show contradict other evidence:

Episode 3 ("Four Horsemen") - On a cockpit voice recorder recovered by Jake Green, pilots are heard discussing mushroom clouds "somewhere in Texas", over Denver, and over Kansas City. There has not been evidence of a Kansas City attack elsewhere in the series, but there have been multiple reports of an attack at nearby Lawrence.
Episode 12 ("The Day Before") - In a flashback to the day before the attacks, Sarah is seen reading a list of intended target cities on Hawkins' laptop. As it can not be assumed that all bombs hit their targets, this can not be used as evidence of an attack. Of the eight cities displayed, there is additional evidence in other episodes of six (Washington D.C., Philadelphia, Los Angeles, Denver, Dallas and Chicago) having been attacked, and New York having survived an attempted attack. No definite evidence either way has been presented regarding St. Louis, which was also reported to have possibly been attacked.
Episode 19 ("Casus Belli") - Darcy Hawkins, monitoring radio broadcasts, mentions a report that the Chicago West refugee camp has continuing riots; but this does not imply that Chicago survived.

Cities with unconfirmed status
Some cities were assumed to have been attacked in early episodes, but have been absent from later episodes. It is unknown if there are production and continuity issues, or simply a result of the poor communication infrastructure in the Jericho universe.
 Cincinnati, Ohio: In "Walls of Jericho", Eric suggests that it may have been Cincinnati's skyline seen in a looped reel of news footage. An attack on the city is not supported by any other source.
 Kansas City, Missouri: Although a pilot on the cockpit voice recorder tape describes seeing a mushroom cloud over Kansas City, an explosion in Kansas City is not supported by any other source. Given the proximity of Lawrence, Kansas, to Kansas City (40 miles), it is likely that the explosion in Lawrence could have been mistaken for Kansas City by the pilot.
 New Orleans, Louisiana: In "9:02", a pin marking New Orleans appears in Robert Hawkins' map, but disappears from some shots. It is not in any maps in future episodes. 
 St. Louis, Missouri: In "The Day Before", St. Louis appears in Robert Hawkins' computer list of intended terrorist targets. However, there is no evidence of either an attack, or a foiled attempt, on the city. It is not marked on any maps.   Airline pilots, heard on a retrieved cockpit voice recorder, see F-16s and believe they belong to a Missouri Air National Guard unit based in St. Louis.

Cities that reportedly survived
Cheyenne, Wyoming, indicated in dialogue as a city where Heather may be taken by the military after she is rescued from a car accident. According to the episode "Reconstruction", Cheyenne is the capital of a partially reunited America, the Allied States of America. It is also mentioned in the 2nd season episode "Jennings & Rall" that the city's population has swollen to over 800,000 and in the episode "Sedition" Jake states that over a million is living there.
Columbus, Ohio, was written on the card given to Hawkins in episode 13, and was the target city to where he was to deliver his bomb. Since Hawkins never delivered the bomb, Columbus was spared. Columbus was also seen as a regional capital on the Blackjack Fairgrounds map. The fake Marines in "Semper Fidelis" said that the government was re-organizing in Columbus, but this was put in doubt after their fraud was discovered before being finally put to rest in "Why We Fight". In Reconstruction it was found out that Columbus had indeed become the capital of the East and is home to the remnants of the old U.S. government. 
Las Vegas, Nevada at least partially survived, based on information from Dr. Dhuwalia in episode 9. However, according to him with electrical power and national supply routes cut, Las Vegas has become isolated in the desert and without adequate supplies, to the point that Dr. Dhuwalia was desperate to leave.
Lexington, Kentucky — In the CBS web feature, "Ask The Mystery Woman", she mentions "Lexington Camp," a refugee camp outside of Lexington, Kentucky. She says that if one made it to Lexington Camp, then they were in pretty good shape.
McCook, Nebraska: Hawkins arranges a meeting at a warehouse in McCook in One Man's Terrorist (although the geographic coordinates at one point refer to Lincoln, Nebraska)
New York City was originally reported as attacked in the Chinese broadcast (marked: 紐約), but was later reported as spared by Gray Anderson. Gray reports the capture of three men in a rental truck who were in possession of a 20-kiloton nuclear device in a steel drum, moments before the device could be detonated. (The New York arrests are credited to heightened security following the September 11, 2001 attacks. It should also be noted that according to the episode "A.K.A.", Robert Hawkins warned his superiors of the attack and gave them plate numbers of the white vans used in the attacks. This is most likely what prevented the detonation of the New York bomb.) New York was also not marked on the Black Jack map. A radio report from Episode 18 confirms New York was spared.
Richmond, Virginia was the home or rally point for one of the members of Hawkins' team. In "Heart of Winter", Hawkins finds photos indicating the family was murdered there after the attacks.
The fictional Rogue River, Kansas was evacuated by Ravenwood Security to a Federal Emergency Management Agency (FEMA) tent-city about a month after the explosion in Denver. After a FEMA flyer cited contaminated groundwater as a result of the nuclear fallout from Lawrence, Kansas, as the reason for the evacuation.
Santa Fe, New Mexico, it is indicated that Major Beck's wife was in Santa Fe during the attack and has lost contact with her.
In "Black Jack", it was noted that Tallahassee, Florida survived, since, as the capital of Florida, it was supporting the president in Montgomery, Alabama.
Topeka, Kansas, is described as the source of the Homeland Security telephone calls in the fifth episode, indicating that Topeka has at least partly survived. Gray Anderson reported that FEMA had set up just outside Topeka and was attacked as they were leaving the city in a FEMA truck.

The counter-attack
In "Reconstruction", Allied States television and Chavez confirm the rumor from "Semper Fidelis" that Iran and North Korea were destroyed with nuclear weapons as a counter-attack for the destruction of the U.S. cities. While the Allied States' official position is that Iran and North Korea were behind the attacks, Chavez shares Hawkins' suspicion that the terrorists were purely domestic and that Iran and North Korea were scapegoats.

Regional capitals

In the episode "Black Jack", the following cities were marked on a map made available at Black Jack Fairgrounds.
 Columbus, Ohio - The fake Marines in "Semper Fidelis" say that Columbus has become the new U.S. capital, but they later admit that what they said was based only on rumors. In "Reconstruction" this is confirmed; but Columbus only controls the states east of the Mississippi.
 Rome, New York - later united with Columbus
 Montgomery, Alabama - later united with Columbus
 San Antonio, Texas - capital of independent Texas; siding with Columbus as of the end of Season 2.
 Cheyenne, Wyoming - capital of the new Allied States of America, controlling the western states except Texas.
 Sacramento, California - later united with Cheyenne, according to "Reconstruction"

In the season finale episode "Why We Fight", it is stated there are three United States federal governments. Colonel Hoffman appears to be taking orders from a government based in Cheyenne, Wyoming, led by Senator Tomarchio, mentioned as leading one of the factions in "Black Jack"; this becomes the Allied States of America. Holdouts are described as "a bloc in the east (coast)" and Texas. The second season opener "Reconstruction" confirms that Sacramento and the rest of the western U.S. have joined up with Cheyenne's ASA, while Montgomery, Rome, and the rest of the eastern U.S. have rallied behind Columbus, leaving Texas as the only significant holdout. The "Blue Line" is a United Nations buffer zone along the Mississippi River, keeping the peace between Cheyenne and Columbus.

The ASA's flag shows 13 vertical stripes, representing the 13 founding colonies as before, but signifying that the new government is taking a "new direction"; and 21 stars, one for each State west of the Mississippi excluding Texas, Hawaii and Alaska. (Texas is independent; the status of Alaska and Hawaii is not known.)

Rogue River, Kansas 
Rogue River is the county seat of the fictional Fillmore County, and is located roughly 90 miles east of Jericho. It is a mid-sized city with a county hospital. FEMA evacuated the city after nearby Lawrence, Kansas, was targeted during a nuclear attack. The city is deserted, and all the living people are evacuated to a tent city.

New Bern, Kansas 
New Bern is a city near Jericho. The town manager is Phil Constantino, who is also the sheriff. New Bern's land is mostly clay, so its citizens have no way of growing crops. After the attacks, New Bern asks for ten percent of Jericho's spring crop, along with salt, in exchange for ten wind turbines. Ten Jericho men are taken to New Bern to help make the turbines, a gesture interpreted by Jericho's mayor, Gray Anderson, as a passive hostage-taking as collateral for Jericho's fulfilling its part of the deal.

When all but one (Eric Green), plus a citizen present in New Bern previously (Heather Lisinski), of the Jericho citizens suddenly return from New Bern with the generators, Jake Green and Robert Hawkins, go to New Bern to look for the missing people. There they discover that New Bern's leaders are planning a military-style attack on Jericho, having converted their factory into a munitions plant. Many buildings in the town, including the city hall, were heavily damaged by Ravenwood private military contractors, an attack residents blame on Jericho's having successfully repelled Ravenwood some time earlier. Residents have been told that Jericho is hoarding supplies.

Hostilities between New Bern and Jericho increase after New Bern attacks Jericho with mortars in an attempt to annex several of Jericho's outlying farms. The situation escalates, and in the season finale, New Bern launches a full assault on Jericho.

At the start of season 2, the Cheyenne Government stops the skirmish and forces a cease-fire. After Major Beck determines that New Bern was the instigator of the skirmish, the town of New Bern remains in lockdown with curfews and extensive military checkpoints. Gunmen from New Bern enter Jericho on numerous occasions, almost gunning down a Jericho citizen in broad daylight.

Heather is appointed as liaison between Jericho and New Bern in an effort to further promote peace and reconciliation.

References

Jericho (2006 TV series)
Jericho (TV series)